Proarctacarus is a genus of mites in the family Arctacaridae. They are found in coniferous forests in mountain regions of western North America.

Species
These three species are members of the genus Proarctacarus:
 Proarctacarus canadensis Makarova, 2003
 Proarctacarus johnstoni Makarova, 2003
 Proarctacarus oregonensis Makarova, 2003

References

Mesostigmata